Richard Kubus (30 March 1914 – 1987) was a German international footballer.

References

1914 births
1987 deaths
Association football defenders
German footballers
Germany international footballers